Jeyran Bolaghi may refer to:
 Jeyran Bolaghi, East Azerbaijan

See also
 Jeyran Bolagh